St. John's Episcopal Church is a historic Episcopal church in Wytheville, Virginia, United States. The church was built between 1854 and 1857, and is a Classical Revival style brick church building on a limestone foundation. The front facade features a pedimented portico with a full entablature supported by four monumental Doric order columns of parged brick.  Atop the slate roof is an octagonal cupola with arcaded belfry.  Attached to the church is a two-story, brick parish hall constructed in 1907, and a large, two-story office wing constructed in 1954.

It was listed on the National Register of Historic Places in 2008.

References

External links
St. John's Episcopal Church website

19th-century Episcopal church buildings
Churches completed in 1857
Episcopal churches in Virginia
National Register of Historic Places in Wythe County, Virginia
Churches on the National Register of Historic Places in Virginia
1857 establishments in Virginia
Individually listed contributing properties to historic districts on the National Register in Virginia